Picnic is a 1996 Japanese film directed by Shunji Iwai. It was released in 1996, with shooting taking place in 1994. The film follows three patients of a mental asylum who misinterpret a passage from the Bible as a sign that the end of the world is imminent, and escape from the walls of the facility to find a place to picnic and watch the event.

The film stars Chara in the first of her two roles in Shunji Iwai's filmography, alongside Tadanobu Asano and Koichi Hashizume.

Plot
A young girl named Coco is dropped off at a mental asylum by her uninterested parents. The asylum is home to young teenagers, including Tsumuji, who killed his teacher and hallucinates him; and Satoru, a friend of Tsumuji's. The staff are blank-faced and abusive to Coco upon her arrival and attempt to take her favorite crow feather wrap, which she holds onto tightly. Coco later befriends Satoru and Tsumuji during an art therapy session.

One morning, after stealing black paint from the art supply storeroom to paint her white asylum uniform black, Coco meets Satoru and Tsumuji as they scale the asylum walls and stare out beyond onto the road. They explain that they are exploring, and that they won't get in trouble if they don't go beyond the wall. Coco follows them along the wall of the block, observing the sights outside. She then runs beyond the block on her own and stops near a church to watch a hymn recital; Tsumuji follows her behind. A priest comes out of the church and has a conversation with them about the nature of God. Tsumuji tells the priest that he is unconvinced of God's existence due to his prayers for the end of the world going unanswered, and Coco defines her birth as the beginning of the world and her death as the end of the world, saying that her parents are her God. The two end up arguing, but the priest stops the fight and hands them a Bible, telling them that they should read it.

Tsumuji peruses the Bible on the way back to the asylum and references to Coco the book of Genesis, stating that God created the world. They are caught and restrained by the asylum staff and taken to a punishment ward, where they lie strapped to beds. Overnight, Tsumuji is raped by a staff nurse, and continues to hallucinate the teacher he killed. The group later become increasingly more absorbed in the Bible that the priest gave them, and are especially interested in a passage describing the end of the world, misinterpreting the book's publishing date as the event's reference point. Excited by the impending apocalypse, the trio head out on another trip, looking for a place to picnic while they watch the final event.

The three walk along the walls once again, but this time they go beyond the church and into the main city, attracting stares. On their walk, they steal a gun from a pursuing police officer and mock a billboard advertisement for sports drink. In a residential area, Satoru reaches for a thrown-out trash bag and opens it looking for food, but is horrified to find a severed hand, and runs away from the other two. Falling off the wall near a grassy field and hitting his head on a rock, he stumbles dazedly while insisting out loud that he has to climb the wall again, before passing out from blood loss.

Coco and Tsumuji continue their walk, but a sudden burst of rain triggers Tsumuji's hallucinations, as it had rained on the day he killed his teacher. Coco comforts him and reveals that she, too, had killed a person; her identical twin sister Kiki, in a game of who-is-fake. They share a brief kiss, then conclude their walk at an offshore beacon as the sun sets. They open their picnic basket, which is empty, and mimic the eating of food, before Tsumuji suggests that shooting the sun with the police officer's gun may trigger the event. Tsumuji fires three shots into the sun, but nothing happens. Coco tells him that he is a lousy shot, then picks up the gun and fires the final bullet into her head, signifying the end of the world. The film ends with the feathers from her wrap bursting into the air as Tsumuji grasps her body, clicking the now empty gun into the sky.

Cast
Chara as Coco, who likes ravens and wears black feathers. She believes that the world started when she was born and will end when she dies.
Tadanobu Asano as Tsumuji, who killed a teacher who tormented him, has hallucinations of this teacher, and wants the world to end soon.
 as Satoru, friend of Tsumuji. He has a crush on Coco.
 as Nurse.
Kazue Itoh as Doctor.
Keiichi Suzuki as Pastor.

Awards

1996 Berlin International Film Festival - Forum of new cinema Prize of the Readers of the Berliner Zeitung

External links 
 

Films directed by Shunji Iwai
1990s Japanese films
Picnic films